The Roman Catholic Diocese of Guaxupé is a diocese located in the city of Guaxupé in the Ecclesiastical province of Pouso Alegre in Brazil.

History
 3 February 1916: Established as Diocese of Guaxupé from the Diocese of Pouso Alegre

Special churches
Minor Basilicas:
Basílica Nossa Senhora da Saúde, Poços de Caldas, Minas Gerais

Bishops
 Bishops of Guaxupé (Roman rite), in reverse chronological order
 Bishop José Lanza Neto (2007.06.13 – present)
 Bishop José Mauro Pereira Bastos, C.P. (2006.04.19 – 2006.09.14)
 Bishop José Geraldo Oliveira do Valle, C.S.S. (1989.09.14 – 2006.04.19)
 Bishop José Alberto Lopes de Castro Pinto (1976.01.16 – 1989.09.14)
 Bishop José de Almeida Batista Pereira (1964.04.02 – 1976.01.16)
 Bishop Inácio João Dal Monte, O.F.M. Cap. (1952.05.21 – 1963.05.29)
 Bishop Hugo Bressane de Araújo (1940.09.19 – 1951.09.03), appointed Coadjutor Archbishop of Belo Horizonte, Minas Gerais
 Bishop Ranulfo da Silva Farias (1920.04.22 – 1939.08.05), appointed Archbishop of Maceió, Alagoas
 Father António Emidio Corrêa (1919.07.03), did not take effect
 Bishop Antônio Augusto de Assis (1916.02.07 – 1918.08.02), appointed Auxiliary Bishop of Mariana, Minas Gerais; future Archbishop

Coadjutor bishop
José Geraldo Oliveira do Valle, C.S.S. (1988-1989)

Other priests of this diocese who became bishops
Hermínio Malzone Hugo, appointed Bishop of Governador Valadares, Minas Gerais in 1957
Geraldo Ferreira Reis, appointed Bishop of Leopoldina, Minas Gerais in 1961
Messias dos Reis Silveira, appointed Bishop of Uruaçu (Uruassu), Goias n 2007

References

 GCatholic.org
 Catholic Hierarchy
 Diocese website (Portuguese)

Roman Catholic dioceses in Brazil
Christian organizations established in 1916
Guaxupé, Roman Catholic Diocese of
Roman Catholic dioceses and prelatures established in the 20th century